Hansel and Gretel is a 1954 West German family film directed by Fritz Genschow. It is based on the fairy tale Hansel and Gretel by the Brothers Grimm. It should not be confused either with another German film Hansel and Gretel or an American film Hansel and Gretel, both of which were released the same year.

It was shot at the Tempelhof Studios in Berlin and on location in Lower Saxony.

Cast
 Wolfgang Condrus
 Heidi Ewert as Gretel
 Fritz Genschow
 Elisabeth Ilna as Witch
 Erika Kruse as Lene
 Rita-Maria Nowotny
 Erika Petrick as Mother
 Wulf Rittscher as Kaufmann Klos
 August Spillner as Father
 Renée Stobrawa as Frau Köper
 Werner Stock as Michael
 Peter-Uwe Witt as Hänsel

References

Bibliography 
 Jill Nelmes & Jule Selbo. Women Screenwriters: An International Guide. Palgrave Macmillan, 2015.

External links 
 

1954 films
1950s children's fantasy films
West German films
1950s German-language films
Films directed by Fritz Genschow
Films based on Hansel and Gretel
German children's fantasy films
Films shot at Tempelhof Studios
1950s German films